LMT may stand for:

Places
Klamath Falls Airport, Oregon, US (IATA code LMT)
Lebanon Mountain Trail, a hiking trail in Lebanon
Lower Merion Township, a township in Pennsylvania bordering Philadelphia

Businesses and organizations
Laredo Morning Times
Latvian Mobile Telephone
Lewis Machine and Tool Company
Lisa McPherson Trust, a defunct anti-Scientology organization
Lockheed Martin, NYSE symbol (LMT)

Other uses
Licensed Massage Therapist
Local Mean Time
Large Millimeter Telescope